The Oetaei or Oetaeans appear to have a group of the various predatory tribes, dwelling upon the northern declivities of Mount Oeta, who are mentioned as plundering both the Malians on the east, and the Dorians on the south. The most important of these tribes were the Aenianes (Αἰνιᾶνες - Aeniānes), called Eniēnes (Ἐνιῆνες) by Homer and Herodotus, an ancient Hellenic Amphictyonic race. They are said to have first occupied the Dotian plain in Pelasgiotis; afterwards to have wandered to the borders of Epirus, and finally to have settled in the upper valley of the Spercheius, where Hypata was their chief town.

References

Greek tribes
Ancient tribes in Thessaly
Oetaea